Jonathan Stuart Bailey (born 25 April 1988) is an English actor. Known for his comedic, dramatic, and musical roles on stage and screen, he is the recipient of a Laurence Olivier Award and a nomination for a Evening Standard Theatre Award.

Bailey began his career as a child actor in Royal Shakespeare Company productions and by eight was performing as Gavroche in a West End production of Les Misérables. He has since starred in contemporary plays such as South Downs in 2012, The York Realist in 2018, and Cock in 2022; in classical plays like the Royal National Theatre's Othello in 2013 and Chichester Festival Theatre's King Lear in 2017; as well as in musicals, namely the London revival of The Last Five Years in 2016 and the West End gender-swapped revival of Company for which he won the Laurence Olivier Award for Best Actor in a Supporting Role in a Musical in 2019.

On screen, Bailey starred in the CBBC action-adventure series Leonardo (2011–2012) and the Disney Channel musical-comedy Groove High (2012–2013) before becoming known for his roles in the ITV crime drama Broadchurch (2013–2015), the BBC satire W1A (2014–2017), and the Channel 4 comedy Crashing (2016). He gained international recognition for his critically acclaimed portrayal of Anthony, Viscount Bridgerton, in the Netflix Regency romance series Bridgerton (2020–present).

Early life
Jonathan Stuart Bailey was born on 25 April 1988 in the Oxfordshire town of Wallingford, to an audiologist mother and Rowse Honey managing director father. He grew up in the neighbouring village of Benson, and is the youngest of four siblings and the only son. He described being brought up by "a co-operative of four brilliant women and a dad who has an incredible work ethic." Bailey decided that he wanted to be an actor at the age of five after his grandmother took him to see a production of Lionel Bart's Oliver! in London. His first ever appearance on stage was in a primary school production of Noah's Ark playing a raindrop. 

Bailey attended The Oratory School while taking ballet lessons, and later studied at Magdalen College School, Oxford under a music scholarship, playing the piano and clarinet. After securing a talent agent at 15 years old and booking acting roles, he eventually declined his university acceptance offer and opted not to go to drama school, later saying that this kept him grounded in the performing arts: "I've never gone in as the overdog, and that's liberating and I don't want that to ever change. I just want to allow my own experiences to come through."

Career

Beginnings as a child actor (1995–2010) 

Through his dance club in Henley-on-Thames, Bailey auditioned for and landed the alternating roles of Tiny Tim and Young Scrooge in the 1995 Royal Shakespeare Company (RSC) production of A Christmas Carol at the Barbican Theatre in London at seven years old. He sang "Where is Love?" from Oliver! for his audition. The following year, he made his television debut in the Victorian period drama Bramwell. Bailey also played Little Baptiste in the RSC's 1996 production of Les Enfants du Paradis. By eight years old, he was performing as Gavroche in a West End production of Les Misérables.

In 2001, Bailey played Prince Arthur for the RSC's King John. He made his feature film debut in 2004 in Five Children and It, a film adaptation of E. Nesbit's fantasy novel of the same name. In 2006, on the day of his last A levels, he started rehearsing for a revival of the play Beautiful Thing in London, taking over the lead role from Andrew Garfield. The Telegraph wrote that Bailey "memorably lit up" the production. This was followed by guest roles in long-running British television staples like Doctors and The Bill. His first leading role on television was in the 2009 BBC sitcom Off the Hook about a group of university freshers.

Rising popularity and breakthrough (2011–2017) 
In 2011, Bailey played the titular Leonardo da Vinci in the 2011 CBBC action-adventure series Leonardo, which follows a young Leonardo and his friends in 15th century Florence. The show ran for two series, spawned an online game, and received four KidScreen Awards. The same year, he starred in the comedy Campus, a semi-improvised sitcom in which he played Flatpack, a student athlete with Olympic potential.

Bailey was nominated for Outstanding Newcomer at the Evening Standard Theatre Awards for his performance in David Hare's well-received play South Downs at Minerva Theatre in 2011, and its later transfer to Harold Pinter Theatre the following year.The Telegraph described him as a future star and one of "the brightest up-and-coming actors currently starring on the West End stage." He also led the Disney Channel musical-comedy Groove High playing the popstar Tom which ran from 2012 to 2013 for 26 episodes and was a mixture of live action and animation where Bailey sang and also did the voiceover of his character's animated form. 

In 2013, Bailey rose to popularity for playing the local journalist Olly Stevens in the first two series of the hit crime-drama Broadchurch on ITV. On stage, he was cast by then Royal National Theatre's artistic director Nicholas Hytner as Cassio in his production of William Shakespeare's Othello at the Olivier Theatre in 2013. The production was shown to cinemas via National Theatre Live. His "likable, open-faced", and "smoothly ambitious" Cassio was "splendid", per The Washington Post. Hytner also directed Bailey in one of the vignettes for National Theatre Live: 50 Years On Stage where he played Valentine Coverly from Tom Stoppard's Arcadia.

Bailey originated the role of Tim Price in Duncan Sheik's musical American Psycho directed by Rupert Goold at the Almeida Theatre. He then guest starred in the Doctor Who episode "Time Heist" in 2014. The episode was described by The Independent as "a fast-paced caper" with Bailey stealing the show with his compelling performance as augmented human Psi. He also had a supporting role in the 2014 period film Testament of Youth based on the First World War memoir of Vera Brittain. Bailey returned to comedy in the 2014 satirical show W1A as BBC employee Jack, a role he would play for three series.

In 2016, Bailey starred as Sam, a sex-obsessed estate agent in Phoebe Waller-Bridge's first television project Crashing, which W magazine described as a "twisted version of Friends". He also played Herod in the American biblical drama film The Young Messiah, based on a novel by Anne Rice. The same year, he headlined the London production of the musical The Last Five Years as Jamie with music, lyrics and direction by Jason Robert Brown at St. James Theatre. The Stages Mark Shenton called the production "poignant" turning "each song into a masterclass of storytelling" with Bailey "a real vocal surprise with his haunting renditions of 'If I Didn’t Believe in You' and 'Nobody Needs to Know'." Edward Seckerson of The Arts Desk wrote, in his five-star review, that Bailey was "sensationally good" and delivered tour-de-force musical performances of 'Moving Too Fast' and 'The Schmuel Song'.

Bailey appeared alongside Ian McKellen in the acclaimed production of King Lear at Chichester Festival Theatre in 2017. He received raved reviews for his performance as Edgar which the Evening Standard described as "a touching study of transformation". Bailey also made a guest appearance in series two episode two of Michaela Coel's sitcom Chewing Gum in 2017 where he played Ash, a romantic interest to Coel's character Tracey. He followed this up with a role in the 2017 biographical film The Mercy directed by James Marsh.

Acclaim and worldwide recognition (2018–present) 
From February to April 2018, Bailey starred in Donmar Warehouse-Sheffield Theatres co-production of Peter Gill's The York Realist. The Evening Standard, The Arts Desk, and Sunday Express gave the production five stars, with The Independent calling it "a pitch-perfect, impeccably acted production" in its own five-star review.

Bailey joined the 2018 West End production of Stephen Sondheim's Company directed by Marianne Elliott. He originated the gender-swapped role of Jamie which was initially written as a female character named Amy. Per The Times, Bailey "received an ovation every night after completing the infamous 'Getting Married Today' a rat-tat-tat, mile-a-minute technical feat, lyrically, about marriage jitters." His "lightning-fast, show-stopping rendition of the song became a must-see West End event" according to Variety, and won him the 2019 Laurence Olivier Award for Best Actor in a Supporting Role in a Musical.

Since 2020, Bailey has starred in the Shondaland-produced Netflix series Bridgerton, an adaptation of Julia Quinn's Regency romance novels, as Anthony, Viscount Bridgerton. His portrayal was critically acclaimed, and gained him international recognition. The second series, which centered around his character, became the most watched English-language television series on Netflix at the time with 656.16 million hours viewed in its first 28 days of release, and debuted number one in 92 countries on the platform on 25 March 2022. Kevin Fallon of The Daily Beast elaborating on Bailey's "exquisite lead performance", wrote that "he has an exceptional ability to carry his angst, pain, and guilt with him without bogging down things into a somber drag."

Bailey headlined the acclaimed 2022 West End revival of Mike Bartlett's play Cock at the Ambassadors Theatre, reuniting him with his Company director Elliot. The Observer'''s Kate Kellaway called it an "immaculate production", with The Arts Desk writing that it was "brutal, bruising, and brilliant". In the lead role, Bailey's "terrific performance" was "utterly captivating", with Varietys David Benedict writing that his "whiplash comic timing lifts his character from self-obsessed to scintillating, a quality he uses both artfully and artlessly."

 Public image 
Bailey has been described by the media as a sex symbol whose fans, according to the Los Angeles Times, span "all genders and orientations." TIME magazine included Bailey in its annual class of Next Generation Leaders in 2022, writing that he is "redefining the 'Hollywood Heartthrob'".

Critic Peter Travers described Bailey as "a dynamite actor equally adept at drama and musicals." Describing Bailey's off-screen persona, The Cut's Kerensa Cadenas noted that talking to him is "a lesson in charm – he’s personable, super-handsome, and utterly hilarious." Douglas Greenwood of GQ wrote that "dispositionally, he's one of those actors who'd rather work than be famous",  with Charlie Brinkhurst-Cuff of The New York Times writing that Bailey took to heart "the advice given to him at 23, he said, by the theater director Nicholas Hytner: Always keep working." 

Phoebe Waller-Bridge described her former co-star as "completely brilliant... unbelievably charismatic in real life and so energetic", "Jonny operates at a different voltage. He's a meteorite of fun with an incredible amount of energy and playfulness." Patti LuPone, Bailey’s Company co-star, declared him "the biggest star in the world" in 2021 after consecutive successes on stage and screen, adding that he is "quite open as a human being. I love him.” Marianne Elliott recalled that Sondheim was enamored with Bailey. Three days before the composer died in 2021, Elliott told him that Bailey would be starring in the play Cock. Sondheim "literally stopped in his tracks, closed his eyes, put his hand on his chest and said, 'Be still my beating heart,'" Elliott recounted. Variety included Bailey in its Power of Pride list of most influential queer artists in Hollywood in 2022. Attitude featured Bailey in their inaugural list of "LGBTQ+ trailblazers changing the world" in 2020. GQ'' described him as "one of the few gay British actors working onscreen whose roles don't seem defined wholly by their sexuality." Pride declared that he is proof gay actors can convincingly play straight roles, with Out writing that Bailey's visibility is inspiring LGBTQ+ performers to come out.

Personal life 
An avid cyclist, Bailey has also competed in marathons and triathlons, in addition to being fond of paddleboarding and mountaineering. In 2018, he climbed the Everest base camp in Nepal, and the following year climbed Ben Nevis, Scafell Pike, and Snowdon within 24 hours to raise money for MND Association Scotland. Resident on the Sussex coast in Hove, he regularly takes cold sea swims in the morning for "exhilaration, ... invigoration, and resuscitation."

Bailey privately came out as gay to friends and family in his early 20s, publicly commenting on it in 2018. Although cautious of discussing his sexuality as it is a personal matter that he noted "becomes a commodity and a currency", he is committed to visibility and representation stating that, "if I can fill spaces that I didn't have growing up then I feel like that's a really brilliant thing" and "something I’ll always strive to do".

Acting credits and awards

References

External links

 
 

1988 births
20th-century English LGBT people
21st-century English male actors
21st-century English LGBT people
English gay actors
English male child actors
English male film actors
English male radio actors
English male stage actors
English male television actors
English male video game actors
Laurence Olivier Award winners
English LGBT actors
Living people
Male actors from Oxfordshire
People educated at Magdalen College School, Oxford
People from Wallingford, Oxfordshire